École Secondaire Népisiguit is the only French-speaking high school in the Bathurst, New Brunswick, Canada area. It holds around 1,200 students from grade nine through twelve.

External links
 ESN School Site
 School District 5

Nepisiguit
Buildings and structures in Bathurst, New Brunswick
High schools in New Brunswick
Education in Bathurst, New Brunswick